Alexander Peya and Bruno Soares were the defending champions, but lost in the opening round to Leonardo Mayer and João Sousa.
Jean-Julien Rojer and Horia Tecău won the title, defeating Kevin Anderson and Jérémy Chardy in the final, 6–4, 6–2.

Seeds

Draw

Draw

Qualifying

Qualifying seeds

Qualifiers
  Austin Krajicek /  Nicholas Monroe

Lucky losers
  Iñigo Cervantes /  Pere Riba

Qualifying draw

External links
 Main draw
 Qualifying draw

2014 Valencia Open 500